Dreamgirls: Music from the Motion Picture is a soundtrack album for the 2006 film Dreamgirls. The album was released by Music World Entertainment and Columbia Records on December 5, 2006 in two versions: a single-disc standard release, and a two-disc deluxe edition. The one-disc version includes highlights from the film's songs, including "And I Am Telling You I'm Not Going", "One Night Only", and "Listen", while the two disc version includes all songs present in the film alongside several bonus tracks.

Background
Harvey Mason Jr. and Damon Thomas of the production team The Underdogs served as producers and arrangers for the film's soundtrack, which is performed by the actors in the film, including Jamie Foxx, Beyoncé Knowles, Eddie Murphy, Jennifer Hudson, Anika Noni Rose, Sharon Leal, Keith Robinson, and others. The soundtrack includes four new songs not present in the stage version of Dreamgirls: "Listen", "Love You I Do", "Patience", and "Perfect World". "Listen" was released to radio the week of October 16 as the first official Dreamgirls soundtrack single; the disco version of "One Night Only" was issued in late summer as a 12" club single and as an exclusive download on iTunes.

Critical reception
The Dreamgirls soundtrack was nominated for the 2008 Grammy Award for Best Compilation Soundtrack Album for a Motion Picture, Television or Other Visual Media, losing to The Beatles' Love. "Listen", "Love You I Do", and "Patience" were all nominated for the 2006 Academy Award for Best Original Song. However, "Love You I Do" won the Grammy that same year for Best Song Written for a Motion Picture, Television or Other Visual Media.

Commercial performance

The one-disc version of Dreamgirls: Music from the Motion Picture debuted at number 20 on the US Billboard 200, with sales of 92,000 units. In its fifth week of release, the soundtrack reached the top of the Billboard 200 with a sales week of 68,000 units. The following week, the soundtrack broke its own all-time low record, holding on to the number one spot with a sales decrease of 9% good for 60,000.
This record was later broken by Taylor Swift selling 52,000 copies of her album Speak Now.

Track listing
All tracks produced by The Underdogs (Harvey Mason Jr. and Damon Thomas) and supervised by Matt Sullivan and Randy Spendlove except for the dance mixes on the Deluxe set (remixed by Eric Kupper & Richie Jones).

Deluxe Edition

Notes
 1 Additional song on this track: "Love Love You Baby" performed by Knowles, Rose and Agron .
 2 Track also includes a medley of "Move", "Love Love You Baby" and "Heavy".
 3 Present in the musical, "Effie, Sing My Song" was recorded and shot for the film, but cut after early previews and replaced with an alternate dialogue version of the corresponding scene. It was included in the director's cut released on Blu-ray in 2017.
 4 Contains instrumental versions of "Dreamgirls", "Dreamgirls (Finale)" and "Love You I Do".
 5 Hidden song on this track: "Effie White's Gonna Win" performed by Hudson.

Personnel
Credits are adapted from the album's booklet.

Technical and production

Producer: Damon Thomas and Harvey Mason Jr. (The Underdogs)
Music supervised by: Randy Spendlove and Matt Sullivan
Engineer: Chris Spilfogel and Dabling Harward from the Underlab in Los Angeles, California, USA
Mixed by: Manny Marroquin, Aaron Renner, and Chris Spilfogel
Assistant Engineers: Aaron Renner and Riley Mackin
Mastered by: Vlado Meller at Sony Music Studios in New York City, New York, USA
Vocals supervised by: Paul Bogaev
Art direction: Erwin Gorostiza, Fusako Chubachi
Album design: Fusako Chubachi
Photography: David James
Package coordinators: Tom Choi and Steven Jacobson
Executive producers: Bill Condon, Mathew Knowles, and Glen Brunman
Arrangements by: The Underdogs, Randy Spendlove, David Campbell, Matt Sullivan, Damon Intrabartolo, Deborah Lurie, Bill Condon, Henry Krieger, Jerry Hey, and Tim Carmon

Music editor: Paul Rabjohns
Orchestral contractors: Jolie Levine and Ivy Skoff
Copyists: Mark Graham, Jo Anne Kane Music
Strings recorded by: Jess Sutcliffe at Capitol Studios in Los Angeles, California, USA
(Assistant engineers: Paul Smith, Aaron Walk, Bryan Walk)
Strings recorded by: Scott Campbell at Henson Recording Studios in Los Angeles, California, USA
(Assistant engineer: Kevin Mills)
Strings recorded by: Troy Halderson at Clinton Studios in New York City, New York, USA
(Assistant engineers: Sheldon Yellowhair, Bryan Smith)
Additional recording done at the Record Plant in Los Angeles, California, USA

Orchestra

Orchestra Conducted by Henry Krieger
Piano: John Beasley, Tim Carmon, Eric Griggs, Greg Phillinganes, Kevin Randolph
Saxophones: Frederick Fiddmont, Daniel Higgins Mark Rivera
Guitars: Mike Delguidice, Eric Jackson, Michael Thompson, Randy Spendlove
Trumpets: Wayne Bergeron, Gary Grant, Jerry Hey
Bass: Nathan East, James Johnson, Harvey Mason Jr.
Trombones: Steve Holtman, William Reichenbach
Drums: Glendon Campbell, Gordon Campbell, Ricky Lawson, Harvey Mason Jr., Harvey Mason Sr., Anthony Moore
Harp: Gayle Levant
Percussion: Harvey Mason Sr., Harvey Mason Jr.
Keyboards: Harvey Mason Jr., Kevin Randolph, Randy Spendlove, Damon Thomas

Celli: Larry Corbett, Steve Erdody, Suzie Katamaya, Daniel Smith, Jennifer Kuhn, Vanessa Freebairn-Smith, Rudolph Stein
Background vocals: Melissa Bereal, Richard Bowers, Raven Dillard, Natalie Ganther, Nicole Ganther, Larry Greene, Camile Grigsby, Cassandra Grigsby, Chara Hammond, Eric King, Erica King, Kalia Rafa, Kevin Shannon, Nicole Thrash, Robert Thrash
Violas: Robert Becker, Denyse Buffum, Andrew Duckles, John Hayhurst, David Stenske, Shalini Vijayan, Kristin Wilkinson
Violins: Roberto Cani, Darius Campo, Susan Chatman, Daphne Chen, Mario Deleon, Armen Garabedian, Berj Garabedian, Endre Granat, Alan Grunfeld, Julian Hallmark, Neil Hammond, Geraldo Hilera, Sharon Jackson, Peter Kent, Songa Lee-Kitto, Natalia Leggett, Demitri Leivici, Cynthia Moussas, Alyssa Park, Sara Parkins, Michele Richards, Anatoly Rosinsky, Haim Shtrum, Tereza Stanislav, Josefena Vergera, John Wittenberg, Kenneth Yerke

Awards and nominations

Charts

Weekly charts

Year-end charts

Certifications

See also
List of Billboard 200 number-one albums of 2007

References

2006 soundtrack albums
Albums produced by Beyoncé
Albums produced by the Underdogs (production team)
Drama film soundtracks
Dreamgirls
Musical film soundtracks
Pop soundtracks
Rhythm and blues soundtracks
Soul soundtracks